Sir Francis le Chen or Cheyne of Straloch was a 14th-century Scottish noble.

Francis was the son of Sir Reginald le Chen (d.1312) and Mary, daughter of Freskin de Moravia of Duffus and of Strabok and lady Johanna de Strathnaver.

Family
He married Isabel, daughter of John Comyn, Earl of Buchan and Isabella MacDuff, and had the following known issue:

Henry of Straloch, died without issue, succeeded by brother Reginald. 
Christiane, married Alexander Seton (Governor of Berwick).
Reginald, married Janet, daughter of William Marischal.
Francis, Dean of Aberdeen.

Citations

References

14th-century Scottish people
Medieval Scottish knights
F